Tiger Fork is a stream in Shelby County in the U.S. state of Missouri. It is a tributary of the North River.

Tiger Fork was named for panthers in the area which pioneer citizens mistook for tigers.

See also
List of rivers of Missouri

References

Rivers of Shelby County, Missouri
Rivers of Missouri